Cornelis "Cees" Dekker (born 7 April 1959 in Haren, Groningen) is a Dutch physicist, and Distinguished University Professor at the Technical University of Delft. He is known for his research on carbon nanotubes, single-molecule biophysics, and nanobiology.

Biography 
Born in Haren, Groningen in 1959, Dekker studied at University of Utrecht, where he received a PhD in Experimental Physics in 1988.

In 1988 Dekker started his academic career as Assistant Professor at the University of Utrecht; in these years he also worked in the United States as Visiting Researcher at IBM Research. It was during this period that Dekker carried out research on magnetic spin systems and on noise in superconductors and semiconductors.

In 1993 he was appointed as Associate Professor at Delft University of Technology. In the mid-1990s Dekker and his team achieved success with the discovery of the electronic properties of carbon nanotubes, the first single-molecule transistor and other nanoscience.

In 1999 he was appointed to the Antoni van Leeuwenhoek Professorship, a chair for outstanding young scientists. In 2000, he was appointed in a regular full professorship in Molecular Biophysics at the Faculty of Applied Sciences at Delft. In 2007, he was appointed as a Distinguished University Professor at Delft. From 2010 to 2012, he was the inaugurating Chair of a new Department of Bionanoscience at the Delft University. Since 2010 Dekker also acts as the Director of the Kavli Institute of Nanoscience at Delft.

Dekker has been awarded a number of national and international prizes, including the 2001 Agilent Europhysics Prize, the 2012 Nanoscience Prize, and the 2003 Spinozapremie. He also was granted an honorary doctorate from Hasselt University, Belgium.

In recognition of his achievements, Dekker was elected Member of the Royal Netherlands Academy of Arts and Sciences in 2003, Fellow of the American Physical Society and the Institute of Physics and in 2014 he was awarded Knight of the Order of the Netherlands Lion.

Work 
Dekker started his research on single carbon nanotubes in 1993 when he set up a new line of research to study electrical transport through single organic molecules between nanoelectrodes. In 1996 a breakthrough was realized with carbon nanotubes. This was achieved in a collaboration with the group of Nobel laureate Richard Smalley. STM and nanolithography techniques were used to demonstrate that these nanotubes are quantum wires at the single-molecule level, with outstanding physical properties. Many new phenomena were discovered, and he and his research group established a leading position in this field of research. Dekker and his research group discovered new physics of nanotubes as well as  explored the feasibility of molecular electronics. In 1998, they were the first to build a transistor based on a single nanotube molecule.

Since 2000, Dekker has shifted the main focus of his work towards biophysics where he studies the properties of single biomolecules and cells using the tools of nanotechnology. This change of field was driven by his fascination for the remarkable functioning of biological molecular structures, as well as by the long-term perspective that many interesting discoveries can be expected in this field. Current lines of research in his biophysics group are in the areas of:

 Solid state nanopores
 Biophysics of chromatin maintenance
 Biophysics of bacteria and bottom up biology, working towards division of synthetic cells

Research achievements 
1980s 

 1988, first realization of a model two-dimensional spin glass and verification of its dynamics

1990s
 1990, first measurement of quantum size effect in the noise of quantum point contacts
 1991, demonstration of a new vortex-glass phase in high-temperature superconductors
 1996, first mesoscopic charge density waves devices; and first electrical measurements on a single metal nanocluster between nanoelectrodes
 1997, discovery that carbon nanotubes behave as quantum coherent molecular wires
 1998, discovery that carbon nanotubes act as chirality-dependent.semiconductors or metals; and discovery of room-temperature transistors, made from a single nanotube molecule
 1999, first measurement of the wavefunction of single molecular orbitals of carbon nanotubes; and discovery of kink heterojunctions of carbon nanotubes which gave decisive evidence for a new Luttinger description of interacting electrons in nanotubes

2000s
 2000, discovery that nanotubes can carry extraordinary large current densities; resolved the controversial issue of electronic transport through DNA molecules by measurements of insulating behavior at the single molecule level; and demonstration of an AFM technique for single-molecule manipulation of nanotubes
 2001, discovery of single-electron transistors at room temperature based on nanotubes; realization of first logic circuits with carbon nanotube devices; and discovery of the molecular structure of DNA repair enzymes with AFM
 2002, exploration of new assembly routes with carbon nanotubes functionalized with DNA
 2003, demonstrated the first biosensors made out of a carbon nanotube; resolved the structure and mechanism of DNA repair proteins; and discovery of a new technique for fabricating solid-state nanopores for DNA translocation 
 2004, discovery of new physics in translocation of DNA through nanopores; first experimental study of ions conduction in nanofluidic channels; first electrochemistry with individual single-wall carbon nanotubes; STM detection and control of phonons in carbon nanotubes; first electrical docking of microtubules on kinesin-coated nanostructures; first biophysics characterization of the mechanical properties of double-stranded RNA; and first single-molecule study of DNA translocation by a restriction-modification enzyme. 
 2005, discovery of the mechanism of DNA uncoiling by topoisomerase enzymes; discovery of long-range conformational changes in Mre11/DNA repair complexes; and first force measurements on a DNA molecule in a nanopore
 2006, first demonstration of molecular sorting in a lab on a chip using biomotors; discovery of nanobubbles in solid-state nanopores; and first estimate of electrokinetic energy conversion in a nanofluidic channel
 2007, first real-time detection of strand exchange in homologous recombination by RecA; discovery of a low persistence length of ends of microtubules; and resolved the mechanism of biosensing with carbon nanotubes
 2008, first observation of protein-coated DNA translocation through nanopores; resolved the origin of the electrophoretic force on DNA in nanopores; discovered a significant velocity increase of microtubules in electric fields; discovered an anomalous electro-hydrodynamic orientation of microtubules; and resolved the origin of noise in carbon nanotubes in liquid
 2009, discovery of a new phenotype for bacteria in narrow nanofluidic slits; and first detection of local protein structures along DNA using solid-state nanopores

 2010s
 2010, developed a new way (‘wedging transfer’) to manipulate nanostructures; first report of DNA translocation through graphene nanopores; and realized hybrid nanopores by directed insertion of α-hemolysin into solid-state nanopores 
 2011, first in vitro measurements of transport across a single biomimetic nuclear pore complex; development of multiplexed magnetic tweezers for kilo-molecule experiments; and resolved the mechanism of homology recognition in DNA homologous recombination
 2012, discovery that nucleoid occlusion underlies the accuracy of bacterial cell division; and first ever study of the dynamics DNA supercoils and the discovery of supercoil hopping
 2013, controlled shaping of live bacterial cells into arbitrary shapes; and discovery of spontaneous fluctuations in the handedness of histone tetrasomes
 2014, first study of Min protein oscillations in shape-shifted bacteria
 2015, discovery that condensin is a highly flexible protein structure; and first detection of DNA knots using nanopores
2018, first direct visual proof for DNA loop-extrusion by SMC proteins

Other interests 
Dekker is a Christian and active in the discussion about the relationship between science and religion, a topic on which he has co-edited several books. In 2005 Dekker became involved in Netherlands-wide discussions about Intelligent Design, a movement that he has since clearly distanced himself from. Dekker advocates that science and religion are not in opposition but can be harmonized.

He wrote the foreword to the Dutch translation of ‘The Language of God' by Francis Collins, the current director of the National Institutes of Health.  Like Collins, Dekker is a proponent of theistic evolution. He actively debates with creationists in the Netherlands. In 2015 he co-wrote a children's book that explained an evolutionary creation to young children.

Reception 
He has more than 270 publications, including more than 20 papers in Nature and Science. Ten of his group's publications have been cited more than 1000 times, 64 papers have been cited more than 100 times, and in 2001, his group work was selected as "breakthrough of the year" by the journal Science.

References

External links 
 CV of Dekker 

1959 births
Living people
Carbon scientists
Academic staff of the Delft University of Technology
Dutch biophysicists
Dutch Christian writers
Dutch nanotechnologists
20th-century Dutch physicists
Fellows of the American Physical Society
Fellows of the Institute of Physics
Knights of the Order of the Netherlands Lion
Members of the Royal Netherlands Academy of Arts and Sciences
People from Haren, Groningen
Spinoza Prize winners
Theistic evolutionists
United Pentecostal and Evangelical Churches members
Utrecht University alumni
Academic staff of Utrecht University
21st-century Dutch physicists